Estadio Nelson Fernández is a multi-use stadium in  San José de las Lajas, Mayabeque Province, Cuba.  It is currently used mostly for baseball games and up to 2011 was the home stadium of the Havana Vaqueros team. Starting from the 2011–2012 series this stadium is the home of the new Mayabeque provincial team "Huracanes" (hurricanes). The stadium holds 8,000 people.

References

Nelson Fernandez
San José de las Lajas
Buildings and structures in Mayabeque Province